Guy Grosso (19 August 1933–2001) was a French actor and humorist. Guy Grosso was the pseudonym of Guy Marcel Sarrazin. He was probably best known as half of Grosso and Modo (together with Michel Modo).

Selected filmography

La Belle Américaine (1961) - Barbemont 
Le procès (1962) - Josef K.'s Colleague (uncredited)
 (1963) - Un villageois 
 (1963)
 (1963) - Un gendarme
Let's Rob the Bank (1964) - Un client
Cherchez l'idole (1964) - Le visiteur à Europe 1 (uncredited)
Une ravissante idiote (1964) - Le premier homme interrogé (uncredited)
Dandelions by the Roots (1964) - Émile, le barman
The Troops of St. Tropez (1964) - Maréchal des Logis Tricard
The Gorillas (1964) - Un agent cycliste
Me and the Forty Year Old Man (1965) - Le valet du casino (uncredited)
The Sucker (1965) - Un douanier 
Pleins feux sur Stanislas (1965) - L'agent à la bicyclette qui verbalise #1
Les Bons Vivants (1965) - Gédeon, le souteneur (segment "Les bons vivants") 
Gendarme in New York (1965) - Maréchal des Logis Tricard 
The Big Restaurant (1966) - Un serveur
La Grande Vadrouille (1966) - Un bassonniste
Les grandes vacances (1967) - Chastenet, un professeur
The Gendarme Gets Married (1968) - Maréchal des Logis Berlicot
 (1969) - Dieudonné Hadol
Le champignon (1970) - L'acteur du film publicitaire
Le gendarme en balade (1973) - Maréchal des Logis Tricard
The Edifying and Joyous Story of Colinot (1973) - Lucas
 (1975) - Le brigadier
 (1975) - Frère Boussenard
Ne me touchez pas... (1977) - Paul Gruber, l'ingénieur du son
 (1977) - Le brigadier de gendarmerie
The Gendarme and the Extra-Terrestrials (1979) - Maréchal des Logis Tricard
 (1979) - De la Madriguière
 (1980) - Corbeau
The Miser (1980) - Brindavoine
 (1982) - Un agent de police
The Troops & Troop-ettes (1982) - Maréchal des Logis Tricard
 (1983) - L'agent Bauju

References 

1933 births
2001 deaths
People from Beauvais
French male film actors
French humorists
French male television actors
French male writers
20th-century French male writers